Tempest (stylized in all caps) is a South Korean boy band under Yuehua Entertainment. The group is composed of seven members: Hanbin, Hyeongseop, Hyuk, Eunchan, Lew, Hwarang, and Taerae. They made their debut on March 2, 2022 with their debut extended play, It's Me, It's We.

History

Pre-debut
Hyeongseop and Lew both participated in Mnet's reality television competition Produce 101 Season 2 in 2017. Lew was eliminated in the third round ranking 23rd and Hyeongseop was eliminated in the final episode ranking 16th. They debuted as Hyeongseop X Euiwoong on November 2, 2017, with the single "It Will Be Good".

Hwarang, under the name Song Jae-won, competed on MBC's reality television competition Under Nineteen in 2018. He was eliminated in episode 12 after placing 11th in the performance team and 32nd overall.

Hanbin competed in Mnet's reality television competition I-Land in 2020. He was eliminated in part 2 and ranked 10th. In October 2020, he held an online fan meeting called "!00%". In December 2020, he opened his official Twitter account, and performed a pre-opening stage at Big Hit NYEL Concert with the song "I&Credible." On June 2, 2021, it was announced that Hanbin had left Belift Lab and signed an exclusive contract with Yuehua Entertainment.

2022–present: Debut with It's Me, It's We, Shining Up and On and On
Tempest was originally scheduled to debut on February 21, 2022 with their debut EP It's Me, It's We. However, on February 14, Yuehua Entertainment announced that they would be postponing the group's debut to March 2, 2022 as all the seven members of the group tested positive for COVID-19. The group made their official debut on March 2, 2022 with their debut extended play, It's Me, It's We.

The group made their first comeback on August 29th, 2022, with their second EP Shining Up.

On November 22nd, 2022, the group released their third extended play On and On.

Members
Adapted from their Naver profile.
 Hanbin
 Hyeongseop
 Hyuk
 Eunchan
 Lew
 Hwarang
 Taerae

Discography

Extended plays

Singles

Awards and nominations

Notes

References

External links
 Official website

Yuehua Entertainment artists
2022 establishments in South Korea
K-pop music groups
Musical groups established in 2022
South Korean dance music groups
South Korean boy bands